is a railway station in the city of Nishio, Aichi, Japan, operated by Meitetsu.

Lines

Station layout
The station has one elevated island platform with the station building located underneath. The station has automated ticket machines, Manaca automated turnstiles and is attended.

Platforms

Adjacent stations

Station history
Nishio Station was opened on October 30, 1911 as a station on the privately held Nishio Railway. It was relocated to its present location on October 1, 1928. On December 21, 1926 the Nishio Railway merged with the Aichi Electric Railway, which was acquired by the Meitetsu Group on August 1, 1935. The station building was completed in December 1973. The tracks were elevated in July 1989.

Passenger statistics
In fiscal 2017, the station was used by an average of 5263 passengers daily (boarding passengers only).

Surrounding area
Nishio city hall
Nishio Shinken Bank head office

See also
 List of Railway Stations in Japan

References

External links

 Official web page 

Railway stations in Japan opened in 1911
Railway stations in Aichi Prefecture
Stations of Nagoya Railroad
Nishio, Aichi